The Japan Open (currently sponsored by Rakuten) is a men's tennis tournament held in Ariake Tennis Forest Park with its center court Ariake Coliseum, located in Koto, Tokyo, Japan. It was originally founded in 1915 as the All-Japan Championships then later known as the Japan International Championships. In 2018, the venue switched to the Musashino Forest Sports Plaza as the Ariake Coliseum is being renovated for the tennis events at the 2020 Summer Olympics. The championship includes men's singles and doubles competitions.

History
The All-Japan Championships was first established in 1915 as a men's only tournament. In 1924 a women's event was added to the programme. The tournament has be mainly played in Tokyo throughout it's long run, but has also been staged in other cities such as Osaka in 1933, 1935, 1937, 1939. Following World War II the event was also known as the Japan International Championships up to the late 1960s. From 1979 until 2008 the Japan Open was a joint tournament for both men and women. This is no longer the case in the aftermath of the Ariake Coliseum hosting another women's professional tournament, the Pan Pacific Open. On the women's side, the Japan Open was held until 2014 on the WTA Tour, and then it was downgraded to a $100,000+H ITF Women's Circuit event. In 2019, the women's event was discontinued. The men's event is part of the ATP Tour 500 series level of tournaments.

Prior to the reorganization of the men's event with the advent of ATP Tour, the Japan Open was known as the Tokyo Outdoor Grand Prix and was part of the Grand Prix tennis tour between 1973 and 1989.

Past finals

Men's singles

Women's singles

Men's doubles

Women's doubles

See also
 Pan Pacific Open
 Japan Women's Open

References

External links
 Official website
 Association of Tennis Professionals tournament profile

 
Tennis tournaments in Japan
Hard court tennis tournaments
WTA Tour
ATP Tour 500
ITF Women's World Tennis Tour
Recurring sporting events established in 1915